The Truth About Love Tour: Live from Melbourne is the fourth video album by American recording artist Pink. It was released on November 15, 2013, as a DVD and Blu-ray video release. The release features performances filmed during the Australian leg of Pink's sixth concert tour, The Truth About Love Tour.

Background
A trailer for the album was released on Pink's official Vevo page on October 10, 2013.

Commercial performance
The video was the best-selling music DVD of 2013 in Australia. It has been certified 16× Platinum by the Australian Recording Industry Association for selling more than 240,000 copies in Australia.

Track listing

Release history

References

Pink (singer) video albums
2013 video albums